Naturita is a statutory town in Montrose County, Colorado, United States. The population was 485 at the 2020 census, down from 546 in 2010.

A post office called Naturita has been in operation since 1882. Naturita is a name derived from Spanish meaning "little nature".

Geography
The community is located in southwest Montrose County within the San Miguel River valley. The community is served by Colorado State Highways 97 and 141.

The San Miguel River flows northwest from Naturita to the Dolores River, which continues northwest to the Colorado River in Utah.

Climate

Demographics

As of the census of 2000, there were 635 people, 257 households, and 164 families residing in the town. The racial makeup of the town was 93.70% White, 2.36% Native American, 0.16% Asian, 1.73% from other races, and 2.05% from two or more races. Hispanic or Latino of any race were 5.04% of the population.

There were 257 households, out of which 35.4% had children under the age of 18 living with them, 44.7% were married couples living together, 12.8% had a female householder with no husband present, and 35.8% were non-families. 28.4% of all households were made up of individuals, and 13.6% had someone living alone who was 65 years of age or older. The average household size was 2.46 and the average family size was 3.06.

In the town, the population was spread out, with 29.6% under the age of 18, 7.9% from 18 to 24, 27.2% from 25 to 44, 21.7% from 45 to 64, and 13.5% who were 65 years of age or older. The median age was 36 years. For every 100 females, there were 95.4 males. For every 100 females age 18 and over, there were 105.0 males.

The median income for a household in the town was $28,977, and the median income for a family was $37,917. Males had a median income of $33,203 versus $15,625 for females. The per capita income for the town was $13,867. About 3.8% of families and 10.0% of the population were below the poverty line, including 6.1% of those under age 18 and 11.8% of those age 65 or over.

Amenities
Naturita has an inn, cafe, gas station, bank, grocery store and a few motels. To the west along Highway 90 in the community of Bedrock is the historic Bedrock Store, where scenes from movies such as Thelma & Louise were filmed.

See also

Montrose County, Colorado
Montrose, CO Micropolitan Statistical Area

References

External links
Town of Naturita contacts
CDOT map of the Town of Naturita

Towns in Montrose County, Colorado
Towns in Colorado